The Dr. Ralph Lyman Bosworth House, located in Corvallis, Oregon, is a house listed on the National Register of Historic Places.

See also
 National Register of Historic Places listings in Benton County, Oregon

References

1922 establishments in Oregon
Houses in Corvallis, Oregon
Houses completed in 1922
Houses on the National Register of Historic Places in Oregon
National Register of Historic Places in Benton County, Oregon